Beauty and the Beast is a fairy tale written by French novelist Gabrielle-Suzanne Barbot de Villeneuve and published in 1740 in La Jeune Américaine et les contes marins (The Young American and Marine Tales). Her lengthy version was abridged, rewritten, and published by French novelist Jeanne-Marie Leprince de Beaumont in 1756 in Magasin des enfants (Children's Collection) to produce the version most commonly retold. Later, Andrew Lang retold the story in Blue Fairy Book, a part of the Fairy Book series, in 1889. The fairy tale was influenced by Ancient Greek stories such as "Cupid and Psyche" from The Golden Ass, written by Lucius Apuleius Madaurensis in the second century AD, and The Pig King, an Italian fairytale published by Giovanni Francesco Straparola in The Facetious Nights of Straparola around 1550.<ref>Harrison, "Cupid and Psyche", Oxford Encyclopedia of Ancient Greece and Rome',' p. 339.</ref>

Variants of the tale are known across Europe. In France, for example, Zémire and Azor is an operatic version of the story, written by Marmontel and composed by Grétry in 1771, which had enormous success into the 19th century. Zémire and Azor is based on the second version of the tale. Amour pour amour (Love for love), by Pierre-Claude Nivelle de La Chaussée, is a 1742 play based on de Villeneuve's version. According to researchers at universities in Durham and Lisbon, the story originated about 4,000 years ago.

Plot
 Villeneuve's Version 

A widower merchant lives in a mansion with his twelve children (six sons and six daughters). All his daughters are very beautiful, but the youngest daughter was named “little beauty,” for she was the most gorgeous among all of them. She continued to be named “Beauty” until she was a young adult. She was the most lovely, as well as kind, well-read, and pure of heart; while the elder sisters, in contrast, are cruel, selfish, vain, spoiled and were jealous of the little beauty.

The merchant eventually loses all of his wealth in a tempest at sea, which sinks most of his merchant fleet. He and his children are consequently forced to live in a small cottage in a forest and work for a living. While Beauty makes a firm resolution to adjust to rural life with a cheerful disposition, her sisters do not and mistake her determination for stupidity.

Some years later, the merchant hears that one of the trade ships he had sent has arrived back in port, having escaped the destruction of its companions. Before leaving, he asks his children if they wish for him to bring any gifts back for them. His oldest daughters ask for clothing, jewels, and the finest dresses possible as they think that his wealth has returned. Beauty asks for nothing but her father to be safe, but when he insists on buying her a present, she is satisfied with the promise of a rose, as none grow in their part of the country. The merchant, to his dismay, finds that his ship's cargo has been seized to pay his debts, leaving him penniless and unable to buy his children's presents.

During his return, the merchant becomes lost during a vicious storm. Seeking shelter, he comes upon a castle. Seeing that no one is home, the merchant sneaks in and finds tables inside laden with food and drink, which seem to have been left for him by the castle's invisible owner. The merchant accepts this gift and spends the night there. The next morning, the merchant has come to view the palace as his own possession and is about to leave to fetch his children when he sees a rose garden and recalls that Beauty had desired a rose. The merchant quickly plucks the loveliest rose he can find, and is about to pluck more to create a bouquet only to end up being confronted by a hideous "Beast" who tries to kill him for stealing of his most precious possession even after accepting his hospitality. The merchant begs to be set free, revealing that he had only picked the rose as a gift for his youngest daughter. The Beast agrees to let him give the rose to Beauty, but only if the merchant brings one of his daughters to take his place without deception; he makes it clear that she must agree to take his place while under no illusions about her predicament.

The merchant is upset, but accepts this condition for the sake of his own life, as he has no choice. The Beast sends him on his way with wealth, jewels, and fine clothes for his sons and daughters, and stresses that he must not lie to his daughters. The merchant, upon arriving home, hands Beauty the rose she requested and informs her that it had a terrible price, before relaying what had happened during his absence. Her brothers say that they will go to the castle and fight the Beast, while his older daughters refuse to leave and place blame on Beauty, urging her to right her own wrong. The merchant dissuades them, forbidding his children from ever going near the Beast. Beauty willingly decides to go to the Beast's castle and the following morning she and her father set out atop a magical horse that the Beast has provided them.

Once they arrive, the Beast receives her with great ceremony and her arrival is greeted with fireworks entwining their initials. After that, the merchant is sent home with a reward the following morning. He gives her lavish clothing and food and carries on lengthy conversations with her and she notes that he is inclined to stupidity rather than savagery.

Every night, the Beast asks Beauty to marry him, only to be refused each time. After each refusal, Beauty dreams of a handsome prince with whom she begins to fall in love. Despite the apparition of a fairy urging her not to be deceived by appearances, she does not make the connection between the prince and the Beast and becomes convinced that the Beast is holding him captive somewhere in the castle. She searches and discovers many enchanted rooms containing sources of entertainment ranging from libraries to aviaries to enchanted windows allowing her to attend the theatre. She also comes across many animals, including parrots and monkeys, which act as servants, but never the unknown prince from her dreams.

For several months, Beauty lives a life of luxury at the Beast's castle, having every whim catered to, with no end of riches to amuse her and an endless supply of exquisite finery to wear. Eventually, she becomes homesick and begs the Beast to allow her to go see her family again. He allows it on the condition that she returns exactly two months later. Beauty agrees to this and is presented with an enchanted ring, which allows her to wake up in her family's new home in an instant when turned three times around her finger. Her older sisters are surprised to find her well-fed and dressed in finery, and their old jealousy quickly flares when their suitors' gazes turn to Beauty, even though she bestows lavish gifts on them and informs the men that she is only there to witness her sisters' weddings. Her father hints that if Beauty is going to her sisters' wedding, he makes it clear that she must marry the Beast as well. However, Beauty rejects her father, and his brothers do all they can to prevent her from going back to his castle, and she reluctantly agrees to stay longer.

When the two months have passed, she envisions the Beast dying alone on the castle grounds and hastens to return despite her brothers' resolve to prevent her from doing so. Once she is back in the castle, Beauty's fears are confirmed, and she finds the Beast near death in a cave on the grounds. Seeing this, Beauty is distraught, realizing that she loves him. Despite this, she remains calm and fetches water from a nearby spring, which she uses to resuscitate him. That night, she agrees to marry him. and when she wakes up next to him, she finds that the Beast has transformed into the Prince from her dreams. This is followed by the arrival of the fairy who had previously advised her in her dreams, along with a woman she does not recognize, in a golden carriage pulled by white stags. The woman turns out to be the prince's mother the queen whose joy quickly falters when she finds out that Beauty is not of noble birth. The fairy chastises the mother and eventually reveals that Beauty is her niece with her actual father being the Queen's brother from Fortunate Island and her mother being the fairy's sister.

When the matter of Beauty's background is resolved, she requests that the Prince tell his tale, and so he does. The Prince informs her that his father the king died when he was young and his mother had to wage war to defend his kingdom. The queen left him in the care of an evil fairy who tried to seduce him when he became an adult; when he refused, she transformed him into a beast. Only by finding true love, despite his ugliness, could the curse be broken. He and Beauty are married and they live happily ever after together.

Beaumont's Version
Beaumont greatly pared down the cast of characters and pruned the tale to an almost archetypal simplicity. The story begins in much the same way as Villeneuve's version, although now the merchant has only six children: three sons and three daughters of which Beauty is one. The circumstances leading to her arrival at the Beast's castle unfold in a similar manner, but on this arrival, Beauty is informed that she is a mistress and he will obey her. Beaumont strips most of the lavish descriptions present in Beauty's exploration of the palace and quickly jumps to her return home. She is given leave to remain there for a week, and when she arrives, her sisters feign fondness to entice her to remain another week in hopes that the Beast will devour her in anger. Again, she returns to him dying and restores his life. The two then marry and live happily ever after.

 Lang's Version 

A variant of Villeneuve's version appears in Andrew Lang's Blue Fairy Book. Most of the story is the same, except at the beginning where the merchant himself is not at sea, but his ships are. His mansion is burned in a fire, along with his belongings, forcing him and his family to move to their country home in the forest. His ships are lost at sea, captured by pirates, etc., except one, which returns later. Unlike the other two versions, the sisters in Lang's story are not jealous of Beauty. Also, Lang maintained the lavish descriptions of the Beast's palace. This version in particular is one of the most commonly told, along with those of Villeneuve and Beaumont.

This version was written between 1889 and 1913, some time after the original version, and so should be considered as a later version of the story.

Analysis
The tale is classified in the Aarne-Thompson-Uther Index as type ATU 425C, "Beauty and the Beast". It is related to the general type ATU 425, "The Search for the Lost Husband" and subtypes.

In a study about the myth of Cupid and Psyche, Danish folklorist Inger Margrethe Boberg argued that "Beauty and the Beast" was "an older form" of the animal husband narrative, and that subtypes 425A, "Animal as Bridegroom", and 425B, "The Disenchanted Husband: The Witch's Tasks", were secondary developments, with motifs incorporated into the narrative.Boberg, I.M. "The Tale of Cupid and Psyche". In: Classica et Medievalia 1 (1938): 181.

Variants
The tale is one of the most popular in oral tradition.

Europe
France
Emmanuel Cosquin collected a version with a tragic ending from Lorraine titled The White Wolf (Le Loup blanc), in which the youngest daughter asks her father to bring her a singing rose when he returns. The man cannot find a singing rose for his youngest daughter, and he refuses to return home until he finds one. When he finally finds singing roses, they are in the castle of the titular white wolf, who initially wants to kill him for daring to steal his roses, but, upon hearing about his daughters, changes his mind and agrees to spare him his life under the condition he must give him the first living being that greets him when he returns home. This turns out to be his youngest daughter. In the castle, the girl discovers that the white wolf is enchanted and can turn into a human at night, but she must not tell anyone about it. Unfortunately, the girl is later visited by her two elder sisters who pressure her to tell them what is happening. When she finally does, the castle crumbles and the wolf dies.

Henri Pourrat collected a version from Auvergne in south-central France, titled Belle Rose (sometimes translated in English as Lovely Rose). In this version, the heroine and her sisters are the daughters of a poor peasant and are named after flowers, the protagonist being Rose and her sisters Marguerite (Daisy) and Julianne, respectively. The Beast is described as having a mastiff jaw, a lizard's back legs, and a salamander's body. The ending is closer to Villeneuve's and Beaumont's versions with Rose rushing back to the castle and finding the Beast lying dying beside a fountain. When the Beast asks if she knows that he can't live without her, Rose answers yes, and the Beast turns into a human. He explains to Rose that he was a prince cursed for mocking a beggar and could only be disenchanted by a poor but kind-hearted maiden. Unlike in Beaumont's version, it is not mentioned that the protagonist's sisters are punished at the end.

Italy
The tale is popular in the Italian oral tradition. Christian Schneller collected a variant from Trentino titled The Singing, Dancing and Music-making Leaf (German: Vom singenden, tanzenden und musicirenden Blatte; Italian: La foglia, che canta, che balla e che suona) in which the Beast takes the form of a snake. Instead of going to visit her family alone, the heroine can only go to her sister's wedding if she agrees to let the snake go with her. During the wedding, they dance together, and when the girl kicks the snake's tail, he turns into a beautiful youth, who is the son of a count.

Sicilian folklorist Giuseppe Pitrè collected a variant from Palermo titled Rusina 'Mperatrici (The Empress Rosina). Domenico Comparetti included a variant from Montale titled Bellindia, in which Bellindia is the heroine's name, while her two eldest sisters are called Carolina and Assunta. Vittorio Imbriani included a version titled Zelinda and the Monster (Zelinda e il Mostro), in which the heroine, called Zelinda, asks for a rose in January. Instead of going to visit her family, staying longer than she promised, and then returning to the Monster's castle to find him dying on the ground, here the Monster shows Zelinda her father dying on a magic mirror and says the only way she can save him is saying that she loves him. Zelinda does as asked, and the Monster turns into a human, who tells her he is the son of the King of the Oranges. Both Comparetti's and Imbriani's versions were included in Sessanta novelle popolari montalesi by Gherardo Nerucci.

British folklorist Rachel Harriette Busk collected a version from Rome titled The Enchanted Rose-Tree where the heroine does not have any sisters. Antonio De Nino collected a variant from Abruzzo, in eastern Italy, that he also titled Bellindia, in which instead of a rose, the heroine asks for a golden carnation. Instead of a seeing it on a magic mirror, or knowing about it because the Beast tells her, here Bellinda knows what happens in her father's house because in the garden there is a tree called the Tree of Weeping and Laughter, whose leaves turn upwards when there is joy in her family, and they drop when there is sorrow.

Francesco Mango collected a Sardinian version titled The Bear and the Three Sisters (S'urzu i is tres sorris), in which the Beast has the form of a bear.

Italo Calvino included a version on Italian Folktales titled Bellinda and the Monster, inspired mostly from Comparetti's version, but adding some elements from De Nino's, like the Tree of Weeping and Laughter.

Iberian Peninsula
Spain
Manuel Milá y Fontanals collected a version titled The King's Son, Disenchanted (El hijo del rey, desencantado). In this tale, when the father asks his three daughters what they want, the youngest asks for the hand of the king's son, and everybody thinks she is haughty for wanting such a thing. The father orders his servants to kill her, but they spare her and she hides in the woods. There, she meets a wolf that brings her to a castle and takes her in. The girl learns that in order to break his spell, she must kill the wolf and throw his body into the fire after opening it. From the body flies a pigeon, and from the pigeon an egg. When the girl breaks the egg, the king's son comes out. Francisco Maspons y Labrós extended and translated the tale to Catalan, and included it in the second volume of Lo Rondallayre.

Maspons y Labrós collected a variant from Catalonia titled Lo trist. In this version, instead of roses, the youngest daughter asks for a coral necklace. Whenever one of her family members is sick, the heroine is warned by the garden (a spring with muddy waters; a tree with withered leaves). When she visits her family, she is warned that she must return to the castle if she hears a bell ringing. After her third visit to her family, the heroine returns to the garden where she finds her favorite rosebush withered. When she plucks a rose, the beast appears and turns into a beautiful youth.

A version from Extremadura, titled The Bear Prince (El príncipe oso), was collected by Sergio Hernández de Soto and shows a similar introduction as in Beaumont's and Villeneuve's versions: the heroine's father loses his fortune after a shipwreck. When the merchant has the chance to recover his wealth, he asks his daughters what gift they want from his travels. The heroine asks for a lily. When the merchant finds a lily, a bear appears, saying that his youngest daughter must come to the garden because only she can repair the damage the merchant has caused. His youngest daughter seeks the bear and finds him lying on the ground, wounded. The only way to heal him is by restoring the lily the father took, and when the girl restores it, the bear turns into a prince. This tale was translated to English by Elsie Spicer Eells and retitled The Lily and the Bear.

Aurelio Macedonio Espinosa Sr. collected a version from Almenar de Soria titled The Beast of the Rose Bush (La fiera del rosal), in which the heroine is the daughter of a king instead of a merchant.

Aurelio Macedonio Espinosa Jr. published a version from Sepúlveda, Segovia titled The Beast of the Garden (La fiera del jardín). In this version, the heroine has a stepmother and two stepsisters and asks for an unspecified white flower.

Portugal
In a Portuguese version collected by Zófimo Consiglieri Pedroso, the heroine asks for "a slice of roach off a green meadow". The father finally finds a slice of roach off a green meadow in a castle that appears to be uninhabited, but he hears a voice saying he must bring his youngest daughter to the palace. While the heroine is at the palace, the same unseen voice informs her of the goings-on at her father's house using birds as messengers. When the heroine visits her family, the master of the castle sends a horse to let her know it is time to return. The heroine must go after hearing him three times. The third time she goes to visit her family, her father dies. After the funeral, she's tired and oversleeps, missing the horse's neigh repeat three times before it leaves. When she finally returns to the castle, she finds the beast dying. With his last breath, he curses her and her entire family. The heroine dies a few days after, and her sisters spend the rest of their lives in poverty.

Another Portuguese version from Ourilhe, collected by: Francisco Adolfo Coelho and titled A Bella-menina, is closer to Beaumont's tale in its happy ending – the beast is revived and disenchanted.

Belgium and the Netherlands
In a Flemish version from Veurne titled Rose without Thorns (Roosken zonder Doornen), the prince is disenchanted differently than in Beaumont's and Villeneuve's versions. The heroine and the monster attend each of the weddings of the heroine's elder sisters, and to break the spell, the heroine has to give a toast for the beast. In the first wedding, the heroine forgets, but in the second she remembers, and the beast becomes human.

In a second Flemish variant collected by Amaat Joos, titled Van het Schoon Kind, the heroine's father is a king instead of a merchant, and when he asks his three daughters what they want him to bring them when he returns from a long journey, the king's youngest daughter asks for a bush of trembling roses while her two eldest sisters asks for robes with golden flowers and a silver skirt. During her stay at the monster's castle the princess has a nightmare where she sees the monster drowning in a pond, and after she wakes up and finds out the monster is not in the corner where he sleeps, she goes to the garden where she finds the monster in the same situation she saw him in her dream. The monster turns into a prince after the princess saves him.

Another Flemish version from Wuustwezel, collected by Victor de Meyere, is closer to Beaumont's plot, the merchant's youngest daughter staying one day more at her family's home and soon returning to the Beast's palace. When she returns, she fears something bad has happened to him. This one is one of the few versions in which the merchant accompanies his daughter back to the Beast's castle.

More similar Beaumont's plot is a Dutch version from Driebergen titled Rozina. In this version, it is Rozina's vow to marry the Beast that eventually breaks the spell.Meder, Theo The Flying Dutchman and Other Folktales from the Netherlands Westport and London: Libraries Unlimited. 2008. pp. 29-37.

Germany and Central Europe
The Brothers Grimm originally collected a variant of the story, titled The Summer and Winter Garden (Von dem Sommer- und Wintergarten). Here, the youngest daughter asks for a rose in the winter, so the father only finds one in a garden that is half-eternal winter and half-eternal summer. After making a deal with the beast, the father does not tell his daughters anything. Eight days later, the beast appears in the merchant's house and takes his youngest daughter away. When the heroine returns home, her father is ill. She cannot save him, and he dies. The heroine stays longer for her father's funeral, and when she finally returns, she finds the beast lying beneath a heap of cabbages. After the daughter revives the beast by pouring water over him, he turns into a handsome prince. The tale appeared in Brothers Grimm's collection's first edition, in 1812, but because the tale was too similar to its French counterpart, they omitted it in the next editions.

Despite the other folklorists collecting variants from German-speaking territories, Ludwig Bechstein published two versions of the story. In the first, Little Broomstick (Besenstielchen), the heroine, Nettchen, has a best friend called Little Broomstick because her father is a broommaker. Like in The Summer and Winter Garden, Nettchen asks for roses in the dead of winter, which her father only finds in the Beast's garden. When a carriage comes to bring Nettchen to the Beast's castle, Nettchen's father sends Little Broomstick, who pretends to be Nettchen. The Beast discovers the scheme, sends Little Broomstick back home, and Nettchen is sent to the Beast's castle. The prince is disenchanted before Nettchen's visit to her family to cure her father using the sap of a plant from the prince's garden. Jealous of her fortune, Nettchen's sisters drown her in the bath, but Nettchen is revived by the same sorceress who cursed the prince. Nettchen's eldest sisters are too dangerous, but Nettchen doesn't want them dead, so the sorceress turns them into stone statues.

In Bechstein's second version, The Little Nut Twig (Das Nußzweiglein), the heroine asks for the titular twig. When the father finally finds it, he has to make a deal with a bear, promising him the first creature that he meets when he arrives at home. This turns out to be his youngest daughter. Like in Little Broomstick, the merchant tries to deceive the bear by sending another girl, but the bear discovers his scheme and the merchant's daughter is sent to the bear. After she and the bear cross twelve rooms of disgusting creatures, the bear turns into a prince.Bechstein, Ludwig The Old Story-teller: Popular German Tales London: Addey & Co. 1854 pp. 17-22

Carl and Theodor Colshorn collected two versions from Hannover. In the first one, The Clinking Clanking Lowesleaf (Vom klinkesklanken Löwesblatt), the heroine is the daughter of a king. She asks for the titular leaf, which the king only gets after making a deal with a black poodle, promising to give him the first person that greets the king when he arrives home. This turns out to be his youngest daughter. The merchant tries to trick the poodle, giving him other girls pretending to be the princess, but the poodle sees through this. Finally, the princess is sent to the poodle, who brings her to a cabin in the middle of the woods, where the princess feels so alone. She wishes for company, even if it is an old beggar woman. In an instant, an old beggar woman appears, and she tells the princess how to break the spell in exchange for inviting her to the princess' wedding. The princess keeps her promise, and her mother and sisters, who expressed disgust at the sight of the old beggar woman, become crooked and lame.

In Carl and Theodor Colshorn's second version, The Cursed Frog (Der verwunschene Frosch), the heroine is a merchant's daughter. The enchanted prince is a frog, and the daughter asks for a three-colored rose.Zipes, Jack The Golden Age of Folk and Fairy Tales: From the Brothers Grimm to Andrew Lang Indianapolis: Hackett Publishing Company 2013 pp. 215-217

Ernst Meier collected a version from Swabia, in southwestern Germany, in which the heroine has only one sister instead of two.

Ignaz and Josef Zingerle collected an Austrian variant from Tannheim titled The Bear (Der Bär) in which the heroine is the eldest of the merchant's three daughters. Like in The Summer and Winter Garden and Little Broomstick, the protagonist asks for a rose in the middle of winter. Like in Zingerle's version, the Beast is a bear.

In the Swiss variant, The Bear Prince (Der Bärenprinz), collected by Otto Sutermeister, the youngest daughter asks for grapes.

The Beast is also a bear in a Slovakian variant titled The Three Roses (Trojruža), collected by Pavol Dobšinský, in which the youngest daughter asks for three roses on the same stem.

Scandinavia
Evald Tang Kristensen collected a Danish version that follows Beaumont's version almost exactly. The most significant difference is that the enchanted prince is a horse.

In a version from the Faroe Islands, the youngest daughter asks for an apple instead of a rose.Bolte, Johannes; Polívka, Jiri. Anmerkungen zu den Kinder- u. hausmärchen der brüder Grimm Zweiter Band Leipzig: Dieterich'sche Verlagsbuchhandlung 1913 p. 242

Russia and Eastern Europe

Alexander Afanasyev collected a Russian version, The Enchanted Tsarevich (Заклятый царевич), in which the youngest daughter draws the flower she wants her father to bring her. The beast is a three-headed winged snake. There is a more famous version, The Scarlet Flower, written by Sergey Aksakov and published in 1858. 

In a Ukrainian version, both the heroine's parents are dead. The Beast, who has the form of a snake, gives her the ability to revive people.

An apple also plays a relevant role when the heroine goes to visit her family in a Polish version from Mazovia, in this case to warn the heroine that she is staying longer than she promised.

In another Polish version from Kraków, the heroine is called Basia and has a stepmother and two stepsisters. In a Czech variant, the heroine's mother plucks the flower and makes the deal with the Beast, who is a basilisk, who the heroine later will behead to break the spell.Baudiš, Josef The Key of Gold: 23 Czech Folk Tales London: George Allen & Unwind Ltd. 1917 pp. 123-128

In a Moravian version, the youngest daughter asks for three white roses, and the Beast is a dog;

In another Moravian version, the heroine asks for a single red rose and the Beast is a bear.

In a Slovenian version from Livek titled The Enchanted Bear and the Castle (Začaran grad in medved), the heroine breaks the spell reading about the fate of the enchanted castle in an old dusty book.

In a Hungarian version titled The Speaking Grapes, the Smiling Apple and the Tinkling Apricot (Szóló szőlő, mosolygó alma, csengő barack), the princess asks her father for the titular fruits, and the Beast is a pig. The king agrees to give him his youngest daughter's hand in marriage if the pig is capable of moving the king's carriage, which is stuck in the mud.

Greece and Cyprus
In a version from the island of Zakynthos in Western Greece, the prince is turned into a snake by a nereid whom he rejected.

The prince is also turned into a snake in a version from Cyprus in which he is cursed by an orphan who was his lover. In the end, the heroine's elder sisters are turned into stone pillars.Garnett, Lucy M.J. Greek Folk Poesy vol. II Guildford: Billing and Sons 1896 pp. 152-157

Asia
Eastern Asia
North American missionary Adele M. Fielde collected a version from China titled The Fairy Serpent, in which the heroine's family is visited by wasps until she follows the beast, who is a serpent. One day, the well she usually fetches water from is dry, so she walks to a spring. When the heroine returns, she finds the snake dying and revives him plunging him in the water. This turns him into a human.

In a second Chinese variant, Pearl of the Sea, the youngest daughter of rich merchant Pekoe asks for a chip of The Great Wall of China because of a dream she had. Her father steals a chip and is threatened by an army of Tatars who work for their master. In reality, the Tatar master is her uncle Chang, who has been enchanted prior to the story, and could only be released from his curse until a woman consented to live with him in the Great Wall.

Southeast Asia

America
North America
United States
William Wells Newell published an Irish American variant simply titled Rose in the Journal of American Folklore. In this version, the Beast takes the form of a lion.

Marie Campbell collected a version from the Appalachian Mountains, titled A Bunch of Laurela Blooms for a Present, in which the prince was turned into a frog.

Joseph Médard Carrière collected a version in which the Beast is described having a lion's head, a horse' back legs, a bull's body, and a snake's tail. Like the end of Beaumont's version, Beauty's sisters are turned into stone statues.

In a variant from Schoharie, New York, collected by Emelyn Elizabeth Gardner with the title The Rosy Story, the heroine is named Ellen. The character that demands the youngest daughter is a headless man, but the Beast-like figure is a large toad.

Folklorist Fanny Dickerson Bergen published a fragmentary variant from Ohio, with the title The Golden Bird, which is the object the youngest daughter asks for.

Mexico
Mexican linguist Pablo González Casanova collected a version from the Nahuatl titled Cizuanton huan yolcatl (Spanish: La doncella y la fiera), in which after returning to her family's home, the heroine finds the beast dead on the ground. The girl falls asleep by his side, and she dreams of the beast, who tells her to cut a specific flower and spray its water on his face. The heroine does so, and the beast turns into a beautiful young man.

South and Central America
Lindolfo Gomes collected a Brazilian version titled A Bela e a Fera in which the deal consists of the father promising to give the Beast the first living creature that greets him at home. The heroine later visits her family because her eldest sister is getting married.

 Broader themes 
Harries identifies the two most popular strands of fairy tale in the 18th century as the fantastical romance for adults and the didactic tale for children. Beauty and the Beast is interesting as it bridges this gap, with Villeneuve's version being written as a salon tale for adults and Beaumont's being written as a didactic tale for children.

Commentary

Tatar (2017) compares the tale to the theme of "animal brides and grooms" found in folklore throughout the world,
pointing out that the French tale was specifically intended for the preparation of young girls in 18th century France for arranged marriages. 
The urban opening is unusual in fairy tales, as is the social class of the characters, neither royal nor peasants; it may reflect the social changes occurring at the time of its first writing.

Hamburger (2015) points out that the design of the Beast in the 1946 film adaptation by Jean Cocteau was inspired by the portrait of Petrus Gonsalvus, a native of Tenerife who suffered from hypertrichosis, causing an abnormal growth of hair on his face and other parts, and who came under the protection of the French king and married a beautiful Parisian woman named Catherine.

Modern uses and adaptations
The tale has been notably adapted for screen, stage, prose, and television over many years.

Literature
 The Scarlet Flower (1858), a Russian fairy tale by Sergey Aksakov.
 Beauty and the Beast ... The Story Retold (1886), by Laura E. Richards.
 Beauty: A Retelling of the Story of Beauty and the Beast (1978), by Robin McKinley.
 Rose Daughter (1997), by Robin McKinley.
 "The Courtship of Mr. Lyon" (1979), from Angela Carter's The Bloody Chamber, based on Madame Le Prince de Beaumont's version. "The Tiger's Bride" in the same book is a variant of the tale.
 Beauty (1983), a short story by Tanith Lee, a science fiction retelling of Beauty and the Beast. Fashion Beast, a 1985 screenplay by Alan Moore, adapted into a graphic novel in 2012.
 "A Grain of Truth" (1993), a short story by Andrzej Sapkowski in The Last Wish. 
 Lord of Scoundrels (1995), by Loretta Chase, a Regency romance and retelling of Beauty and the Beast.
 The Fire Rose (1995), by Mercedes Lackey.
 Beauty (1997), modern retelling by Susan Wilson
 The Quantum Rose, by Catherine Asaro, a science fiction retelling of Beauty and the Beast. 
 Beastly (2007), by Alex Flinn, a version that sets the story in modern-day Manhattan.
 Bryony and Roses (2015), by T. Kingfisher (pen name of Ursula Vernon)
 Belle: An Amish Retelling of Beauty and the Beast (2017), by Sarah Price
 A Court of Thorns and Roses (2015), by Sarah J. MaasA Curse So Dark and Lonely (2019), by Brigid Kemmerer

Film
 La Belle et la Bête (1946), directed by Jean Cocteau, starring Jean Marais as the Beast and Josette Day as Beauty.
 The Scarlet Flower (1952), an animated feature film directed by Lev Atamanov and produced at the Soyuzmultfilm.
 Beauty and the Beast (1962), directed by Edward L. Cahn, starring Joyce Taylor and Mark Damon.Panna a netvor (1978), a Czech film directed by Juraj Herz.
  Beauty and the Beast, a planned animated film that was to be directed by Don Bluth and distributed by Columbia Pictures. It was announced in 1984 and subsequently canceled in 1989.
 Beauty and the Beast (1987), a musical live-action version directed by Eugene Marner, starring John Savage as Beast, and Rebecca De Mornay as Beauty. 
 Beauty and the Beast (1991), an animated film produced by Walt Disney Feature Animation and directed by Kirk Wise and Gary Trousdale, with a screenplay by Linda Woolverton, and songs by Alan Menken and Howard Ashman.
 Beauty and the Beast (1992), a direct-to-video animated feature film unrelated to the preceding year's Disney release but containing similar packaging, featuring Irene Cara as the voice of Beauty, Jan Rabson as Beauty's father, and Susan Silo as Beauty's sister Alicia, Clara the Fairy Housekeeper, and the evil fairy that was Clara's sister.
 Blood of Beasts (2005), a Viking period film directed by David Lister alternately known as Beauty and the Beast.
 Spike (2008), directed by Robert Beaucage, a dark version of the fairy tale updated to modern times.
 Beauty and the Beast (2009), an Australian fantasy reimagining of the tale, starring Estella Warren.
 Beastly (2011), directed by Daniel Barnz and starring Alex Pettyfer as the beast (named Kyle) and Vanessa Hudgens as the love interest.
 Beauty and the Beast (2014), a French-German film.
 Beauty and the Beast (2017), a Disney live-action adaptation of the 1991 animated film, starring Emma Watson and Dan Stevens.
 Belle (2021), a Japanese animated science fantasy film written and directed by Mamoru Hosoda and produced by Studio Chizu.

Television
 Shirley Temple's Storybook episode "Beauty and the Beast" (1958), broadcast live and in color starring Claire Bloom and Charlton Heston.
 Beauty and the Beast (1976), a made-for-television movie starring George C. Scott and Trish Van Devere.
 Manga Sekai Mukashi Banashi (1976-79), anime anthology series animated by Dax International features a 10-minute adaptation.
 "Beauty and the Beast" (1984), an episode of Shelley Duvall's Faerie Tale Theatre, starring Klaus Kinski and Susan Sarandon. 
 Beauty and the Beast (1987), a television series which centers around the relationship between Catherine (played by Linda Hamilton), an attorney who lives in New York City, and Vincent (played by Ron Perlman), a gentle but lion-faced "beast" who dwells in the tunnels beneath the city.
 Hello Kitty's Furry Tale Theater (1987), episode Kitty and the Beast, created by Sanrio, produced by DIC Enterprises and animated by Toei Animation.
 Grimm's Fairy Tale Classics episode "Beauty and the Beast (The Story of the Summer Garden and the Winter Garden)" (1988). The Beast is depicted with an ogre-like appearance.
 Britannica's Tales Around the World (1990-91), features three variations of the story.
 World Fairy Tale Series (Anime sekai no dōwa) (1995), anime television anthology produced by Toei Animation, has half-hour adaptation.
 Happily Ever After: Fairy Tales for Every Child had an episode featuring the African adaption of "Beauty and the Beast" which starred the voices of Vanessa L. Williams as Beauty, Gregory Hines as the Beast, and Paul Winfield as Beauty's Father. The Beast is depicted as having a rhinoceros head, a lion-like mane and tail, a humanoid body, and a camel-like hump where he is served by gargoyle-like servants.
 Wolves, Witches and Giants (1995-99), episode Beauty and the Beast, season 2 episode 12. 
 Stories from My Childhood, episode "Beauty and the Beast (A Tale of the Crimson Flower)" (1998), featuring the voices of Amy Irving as Beauty, Tim Curry as the Beast, and Robert Loggia as Beauty's father.
 Beauty (1998), a made-for-television movie starring Janine Turner and Jamey Sheridan.
 The Triplets (Les tres bessones/Las tres mellizas) (1997-2003), catalan animated series, has a spoof of the fairy tale in episode 22 from the third season.
 Simsala Grimm (1999-2010), episode 12 of season 3.
 Beauty & the Beast (2012), a reworking of the 1987 TV series starring Jay Ryan and Kristin Kreuk.
 Once Upon a Time episode "Skin Deep" (2012), starring Emilie de Ravin as Belle and Eric Keenleyside as Maurice. In this show, Rumplestiltskin (portrayed by Robert Carlye) was amalgamated with the Beast and the Crocodile form Peter Pan.
  (2014), an Italian/Spanish two-part miniseries starring Blanca Suárez and Alessandro Preziosi.
 Sofia the First episode "Beauty is the Beast" (2016), in which Princess Charlotte of Isleworth (voiced by Megan Hilty) is turned into a beast (a cross between a human and a wild boar with a wolf-like tail) by a powerful enchantress for how she treated a local goblin (voiced by Andrew Rannells).

Theatre
 La Belle et la Bête (1994), an opera by Philip Glass based on Cocteau's film. Glass's composition follows the film scene by scene, effectively providing a new original soundtrack for the movie.
 Beauty and the Beast (1994), a musical adaptation of the Disney film by Linda Woolverton and Alan Menken, with additional lyrics by Tim Rice.
 Beauty and the Beast (2011), a ballet choreographed by David Nixon for Northern Ballet, including compositions by Bizet and Poulenc.

Other
 A hidden object game, Mystery Legends: Beauty and the Beast, was released in 2012.
 The hidden object game series Dark Parables based the main story of ninth game (The Queen of Sands) on the tale.
 The narrative of the Sierra Entertainment adventure game King's Quest VI follows several fairy tales, and Beauty and the Beast is the focus of one multiple part quest.
 Stevie Nicks recorded "Beauty and the Beast" for her 1983 solo album, The Wild Heart.
 Real Life based the video for their signature hit "Send Me an Angel" on the fairy story.
 Disco producer Alec R. Costandinos released a twelve inch by his side project Love & Kisses with the theme of the fairy-tale set to a disco melody in 1978.
 The interactive fiction work, Bronze by Emily Short, is a puzzle-oriented adaptation of Beauty and the Beast.

See also
 Eros and Psyche
 East of the Sun and West of the Moon
 Thabaton and Keibu Keioiba - Meitei mythology equivalent of the Beauty and the Beast
 The King of the Snakes (Chinese folktale)
 Noble savage
 Shapeshifting

References

Footnotes

Further reading
Ralston, William. "Beauty and the Beast". In: The Nineteenth Century. Vol. 4. (July–December, 1878). London: Henry S. King & Co. pp. 990–1012.

External links

 "The Story of the Beauty and the Beast", James Planché's translation of Gabrielle-Suzanne de Villeneuve's original version of the fairytale, on Project Gutenberg.
 The story of beauty & the beast; the complete fairy story translated from the French by Ernest Dowson on Internet Archive. Ernest Dowson's translation of de Villeneuve's original fairytale.
 "Beauty and the Beast", the revised and abridged version by Jeanne-Marie Leprince de Beaumont, at the website of the University of Pittsburgh. 
 "Beauty and the Beast: folktales of Aarne-Thompson type 425C
 Cinderella Bibliography – includes an exhaustive list of B&tB productions in books, TV and recordings
 Original version and psychological analysis of Beauty and the Beast (Archive on Wayback Machine)''
  La Belle et la Bête, audio version 

1740 works
 
Fiction about shapeshifting
French fairy tales
Love stories

ATU 400-459